Johannes Jordell (24 June 1879 – 23 August 1958) was a Norwegian sport shooter. He was born in Arendal, and his club was Oslo Sportsskyttere. He competed in military rifle and small-bore rifle at the 1912 Summer Olympics in Stockholm.

References

External links

1879 births
1958 deaths
People from Arendal
Shooters at the 1912 Summer Olympics
Olympic shooters of Norway
Norwegian male sport shooters
Sportspeople from Agder